Brian Ford is a British radio broadcaster. He started as one of the original DJs on Radio Clyde from its beginning, having worked for other radio stations prior. He still works for 1152 Clyde 2 and was previously a continuity announcer on BBC Radio Scotland. In the 1970s he was the host of the punk rock/new wave radio show Streetsounds.

TV
Between 1988 and 2006 Brian was a continuity announcer for Scottish television, before becoming an announcer for BBC Scotland.

References

 http://www.clyde2.com/sectional.asp?ID=553
 Continuity announcers in the United Kingdom

External links
 http://theprimalscream.com/press/uncut-nov99.html

British radio DJs
Radio and television announcers
Year of birth missing (living people)
Living people